Wendell P. Gardner, Jr. (born August 28, 1946) is a former associate judge on the Superior Court of the District of Columbia.

Education and career 
Gardner earned his Bachelor of Arts from Howard University in 1969, and his Juris Doctor from Washington University in St. Louis, Missouri in 1971.

After graduating, he  registered lobbyist for Sears, Roebuck & Co. In 1981, he went into private practice.

D.C. Superior Court 
President George H. W. Bush nominated Gardner on January 4, 1991, to a fifteen-year term as an associate judge on the Superior Court of the District of Columbia to the seat vacated by Annice M. Wagner. On June 4, 1991, the Senate Committee on Homeland Security and Governmental Affairs held a hearing on his nomination. On June 27, 1991, the Committee reported his nomination favorably to the senate floor. On June 28, 1991, the full United States Senate confirmed his nomination by unanimous consent. He retired on March 27, 2020.

References

1946 births
Living people
20th-century American judges
21st-century American judges
African-American judges
Howard University alumni
Judges of the Superior Court of the District of Columbia
Lawyers from Washington, D.C.
Washington University in St. Louis alumni